The KTM Class 19 is a class of shunting locomotive for Keretapi Tanah Melayu. The locomotives are based in major train stations for duty of shunting freight and passenger cars. As they are classed as shunters, they are limited to major train stations only and do not operate on the mainline.

History
10 locomotives were acquired around 1983 and were quickly assigned shunting duties around Malaysia. As of February 2015 all are in active service.

References

http://www.keretapi.com/website/trains/19-class/ 

Keretapi Tanah Melayu
Railway locomotives introduced in 1983
Diesel-electric locomotives of Malaysia
Metre gauge diesel locomotives
Hitachi locomotives
Bo′Bo′ locomotives
Bo-Bo locomotives